The Llobregat Delta is the delta of the Llobregat river, located near the city of Barcelona, Catalonia, northeastern Spain. The current delta has been altered by farming, urban development, industrialisation and transport infrastructures such as the Port of Barcelona and the Barcelona El Prat Airport.

The Natural Areas of the Llobregat Delta 
The Natural Areas of the Llobregat Delta is a network of protected areas established in 1987 that belongs to the municipalities of El Prat de Llobregat, Viladecans, Gavà and Sant Boi de Llobregat. It encompasses more than 900 hectares over the eastern bank of the river that have been declared a Special Protection Area as a designation under the European Union Directive on the Conservation of Wild Birds.

References

External links 

Consortium of the Natural Areas of Delta del Llobregat
Government of Catalonia website 

Baix Llobregat
Estuaries of Spain
Protected areas established in 2010
Protected areas of Catalonia
Province of Barcelona
River deltas of Europe
Wetlands of Catalonia